Giuliano di Roma is a comune (municipality) in the province of Frosinone in the Italian region Lazio, located about  southeast of Rome and about  southwest of Frosinone.

Blessed Maria Caterina Troiani, a charitable activist, was born here in 1813.

References

Cities and towns in Lazio